Heartbleed is a security bug in the open-source OpenSSL cryptography library.

Heartbleed may also refer to:

 "Heartbleed", a song by Tamra Keenan

See also
 Bleeding heart (disambiguation)
 "Hearts That Bleed", a song by State of Shock
 "My Heart Bleeds the Darkest Blood", a song by Shai Hulud